The Immediate Geographic Region of Belo Horizonte is one of the 10 immediate geographic regions in the Intermediate Geographic Region of Belo Horizonte, one of the 70 immediate geographic regions in the Brazilian state of Minas Gerais and one of the 509 of Brazil, created by the National Institute of Geography and Statistics (IBGE) in 2017.

Municipalities 
It comprises 29 municipalities:

 Belo Horizonte
 Betim
 Brumadinho
 Caeté   
 Confins   
 Contagem  
 Esmeraldas   
 Florestal  
 Ibirité   
 Igarapé    
 Jaboticatubas   
 Juatuba    
 Lagoa Santa    
 Mário Campos     
 Mateus Leme  
 Moeda
 Nova Lima    
 Nova União   
 Pedro Leopoldo
 Raposos    
 Ribeirão das Neves
 Rio Acima
 Sabará     
 Santa Luzia  
 São Joaquim de Bicas
 São José da Lapa
 Sarzedo
 Taquaraçu de Minas
 Vespasiano

References 

Geography of Minas Gerais